15440 Eioneus, provisional designation: , is a dark Jupiter trojan from the Greek camp, approximately  in diameter. It was discovered on 19 November 1998, by astronomers with the Catalina Sky Survey at the Catalina Station near Tucson, Arizona, in the United States. The assumed C-type asteroid belongs to the 60 largest Jupiter trojans. It has a rotation period of 21.43 hours and possibly a spherical shape. It was named from Greek mythology after Eioneus who was killed by Hector.

Orbit and classification 

Eioneus  is a dark Jovian asteroid orbiting in the leading Greek camp at Jupiter's  Lagrangian point, 60° ahead of the Gas Giant's orbit in a 1:1 resonance . It is also a non-family asteroid in the Jovian background population.

It orbits the Sun at a distance of 5.2–5.4 AU once every 12 years and 2 months (4,455 days; semi-major axis of 5.3 AU). Its orbit has an eccentricity of 0.02 and an inclination of 29° with respect to the ecliptic. The body's observation arc begins with a precovery published by the Digitized Sky Survey and taken at the Palomar Observatory in November 1951, or 47 years prior to its official discovery observation at Catalina.

Naming 

This minor planet was numbered on 21 June 2000. On 14 May 2021, the object was named from Greek mythology by the Working Group Small Body Nomenclature (WGSBN), after the Greek warrior Eioneus who was killed by a spear from Hector during the Trojan War.

Physical characteristics 

Eioneus is an assumed C-type asteroid, while the majority of large Jupiter trojans are D-types. It has a typical V–I color index of 0.97.

Rotation period 

Since January 2013, a large number of a rotational lightcurve of Eioneus have been obtained from photometric observations by Robert Stephens at the Center for Solar System Studies in California. Analysis of the best-rated lightcurve from June 2017 gave a longer-than-average rotation period of  hours with a low brightness amplitude of  magnitude, indicative of a rather spherical shape.

Diameter and albedo 

According to the surveys carried out by the Japanese Akari satellite, the Infrared Astronomical Satellite IRAS and the NEOWISE mission of NASA's Wide-field Infrared Survey Explorer, Eioneus measures between 62.52 and 71.88 kilometers in diameter and its surface has an albedo between 0.072 and 0.092. The Collaborative Asteroid Lightcurve Link derives an albedo of 0.0585 and a diameter of 66.04 kilometers based on an absolute magnitude of 9.6.

Notes

References

External links 
 Asteroid Lightcurve Database (LCDB), query form (info )
 Discovery Circumstances: Numbered Minor Planets (15001)-(20000) – Minor Planet Center
 
 

015440
015440
Named minor planets
19981119